The Gourds are an American alternative country band that formed in Austin, Texas,  United States, during the summer of 1994. After playing together for 19 consecutive years, the band went on hiatus in 2013.

Career
Primarily evolving from the Picket Line Coyotes and the Grackles, The Gourds first line-up consisted of Kevin Russell (vocals, guitar, mandolin), Jimmy Smith (vocals, bass, guitar), Claude Bernard (accordion, guitar, vocals), and Charlie Llewellin (drums, percussion). Llewellin was replaced by Keith Langford shortly after the second album was recorded, and multi-instrumentalist Max Johnston officially joined the band after being invited to play on their third album. By the following album, Johnston had also become the band's third songwriter, though Russell and Smith continued to share the bulk of those responsibilities.

Despite a sizable amount of original material, The Gourds are probably best known for a song they did not write, and for which they initially did not receive credit. A recording of the band's cover of Snoop Dogg's "Gin and Juice" was widely shared on the popular file-sharing site Napster, with the song miscredited to the band Phish. In fact, for most of the 16 years following their first live performance of the song, fans could regularly be heard calling out for the band's cover version of the song, sometimes before the show had even started. This led some to consider it an albatross, but the band continued to play the crowd pleaser, often adding a medley of impromptu cover songs to its midsection.

While The Gourds' studio efforts were generally well received, their high-energy live performances and constant touring earned them the reputation of a band that had to be seen to be appreciated. As a result, they enjoyed a dedicated fan base that was happy to follow them from town to town, and became a favorite among those who tape live music.

In March 2011, The Gourds traveled to Levon Helm's studio in Woodstock, New York to record their 10th studio album, Old Mad Joy. Produced by Larry Campbell, the record was released by Vanguard Records on September 13 that same year.

In August 2011, director Doug Hawes-Davis began shooting a documentary on the band that combined candid interviews with live performances, past and present. Musician and filmmaker Brendan Canty worked as a camera operator and ran location sound on the project, which drew partial funding from Kickstarter in 2012 and premiered in Austin at the South by Southwest film festival on March 13, 2013. The film was released on DVD in 2014.

On October 18, 2013, The Gourds announced that they were taking a hiatus. No reason was provided. Their final show before the break occurred on October 27, 2013, at Threadgill's World Headquarters in Austin, Texas. Despite having only nine days notice, Gourds fans from 26 different states were in attendance, and many more watched from home via live streaming video. During an interview the following year, Russell stated, “I think it’s done,” adding, “The only reason we said hiatus was that we didn’t want to say it was done, because that would be final". In response to Russel's comments, Langford stated, "I still wish that someday there could be a project of some kind. Knowing all these dudes, it probably wouldn't be an extended thing. But, some new songs or shows or something". Two months later, in December 2014, Russell seemed slightly more accepting of the idea when he said, "We left it open-ended for a reason . . . I have a little hope that one day we'll get back together and do something". To date, Bernard, Johnston, and Smith have not commented publicly on either the hiatus or the possibility of a reunion.

Members
Claude Bernard – accordion, keyboards, backing vocals, acoustic guitar, percussion
Max Johnston – vocals,  backing vocals, fiddle, lap steel guitar, mandolin, acoustic guitar, banjo
Keith Langford – drums, harmonica, backing vocals
Kevin Russell – vocals,  backing vocals, mandolin, guitars, acoustic guitar, harmonica
Jimmy Smith – vocals, backing vocals, bass, acoustic guitar, percussion, harmonica, double bass

Discography

Studio albums
Dem's Good Beeble – 1996
Stadium Blitzer – 1998
Ghosts of Hallelujah – 1999
Bolsa de Agua – 2000
Shinebox – 2001
Cow Fish Fowl or Pig – 2002
Blood of the Ram – 2004
Heavy Ornamentals – 2006
Noble Creatures – 2007
Haymaker! – 2009
Old Mad Joy – 2011

Studio covers and live originals
Gogitchyershinebox – 1998
Shinebox – 2001

Soundtracks
Growin' a Beard – 2003
Something's Brewin' in Shiner – 2004
All The Labor – 2014

Side projects
Smith: Slosinger/Redbury – 2000
Smith: Cold War's Hot Water Shower: Featuring Dr. B – 2001
Bernard: The Tinys – 2001 (unreleased)
Russell: Buttermilk & Rifles – 2002
Russell: Shinyribs: Well After Awhile – 2010
Russell: Shinyribs: Gulf Coast Museum – 2013
Smith/Bernard:  The Hard Pans: Budget Cuts – 2014
Johnston: Max Johnston: Dismantling Paradise – 2014
Russell: Shinyribs: Okra Candy – 2015

Television and film
The Gourds have been featured on Austin City Limits (2006) and appeared briefly playing their song "Declineometer" in the season one "Homecoming" episode of Friday Night Lights (2006). They were the subject of a 96-minute documentary by director Doug Hawes-Davis entitled All the Labor (2013). Their song "Dying of the Pines" was included in the HBO Documentary Unknown Soldier: Searching for a Father (2005) and their cover of "Gin and Juice" was used in the season three episode of My Name Is Earl (2007) entitled "The Frank Factor". The band has also scored the Mike Woolf documentaries Growin' a Beard (2003) and Something's Brewin' in Shiner (2004).

See also
Music of Austin

References

External links
 The Gourds official website

American alternative country groups
Musical groups from Austin, Texas
Musical groups established in 1994
1994 establishments in Texas
Yep Roc Records artists
Vanguard Records artists
Progressive bluegrass music groups
Sugar Hill Records artists